"The Nameless One" is the debut solo single from former Transvision Vamp lead singer Wendy James. It was released in the first quarter of 1993 as the lead single from James' debut solo album Now Ain't the Time for Your Tears. Written by Elvis Costello, the song marked a more alternative direction in sound, slightly different from the pop/rock stylings of Transvision Vamp. The single met with limited success, only peaking at number thirty-four on the UK Singles Chart and spending just three weeks in the top one-hundred.

Track listing
CD single/7" single
"The Nameless One" – 4:13
"I Just Don't Want It Anymore" – 4:33 (Written by Wendy James)

Maxi single
"The Nameless One" – 4:13
"Only A Fool" – 4:21 (Wendy James)
"I Need You Now" – 4:25 (Wendy James)

Maxi double
"The Nameless One" – 4:13
"I Just Don't Want It Anymore" – 4:33
"May I Have Your Autograph" – 4:08 (Wendy James)

Charts

References

Songs written by Elvis Costello
Song recordings produced by Chris Kimsey
MCA Records singles
1993 debut singles
1993 songs